The Keystone LB-5 (originally ordered under the Huff-Daland name) was a bomber aircraft produced in the United States in the late 1920s. Its manufacturer nicknamed it the Pirate, but this name was not officially adopted by the United States Army Air Corps (USAAC).

Design and development
The LB-5 was a member of the family of closely related bomber designs that had debuted with the XLB-1 in 1923, and as such, was a large, single-bay, conventional biplane. Like most of the family, it was a twin-engine machine, with engines mounted in nacelles on the lower wing. The prototype XLB-5 had a single tail fin like the XLB-1, the 10 LB-5 production machines were designed with a triple-finned tail under the Huff-Daland name, but the final batch of 25 was redesigned with twin tails and designated LB-5A.

Operational history
Its Liberty L-12 engines featured duralumin adjustable-pitch propellers built by the Standard Steel Propeller Company of Pittsburgh, Pennsylvania, (forerunner of the Hamilton Standard Propeller Company). At least nine tests of tensile strength were made of its propeller blades between 1925 and 1927, one of which reported failure after 34 hours of flying time and 10 hours of testing.

On 28 May 1927, while at 1,200 ft altitude near Reynoldsburg, Ohio, the XLB-5 prototype (AC serial 26-208) experienced catastrophic failure of its right engine when a blade separated from the hub with explosive power, tearing the engine apart. Shrapnel sprayed the five-man crew, which included 2nd Bombardment Group commander Major Lewis H. Brereton, flying co-pilot, and all except the nosegunner immediately parachuted. The nosegunner died in the crash, and the gasoline-soaked wreckage subsequently exploded and burned on the ground.

Variants
 XLB-5 – Prototype (1 built from LB-1) with single tail fin 
 LB-5 – first production batch with triple tail fins (10 built)
 LB-5A – second production batch with twin tails (25 built)

Operators

 United States Army Air Corps

Specifications (LB-5)

References

Notes

Bibliography

 Taylor, Michael J. H. Jane's Encyclopedia of Aviation. London: Studio Editions, 1989, p. 559. 
 World Aircraft Information Files. London: Bright Star Publishing, File 899 Sheet 09.

External links

 National Museum of the USAF XLB-5 fact sheet
 National Museum of the USAF LB-5 fact sheet
 National Museum of the USAF LB-5A fact sheet
 American Bombing Aircraft

LB-5
Light bombers
Keystone LB-5